Benjamin Russell Driebergen (born January 1, 1983) is an American Marine Corps veteran and reality television personality, best known for competing on and winning Survivor: Heroes vs. Healers vs. Hustlers. In 2020, he returned to compete in the show's 40th season, Survivor: Winners at War., finishing in 5th.

Early life
Driebergen attended Capital High School in Boise, Idaho. When he was about 12 years old, his father came out to the family and his parents separated. After graduating in 2001, he eventually enlisted in the United States Marine Corps. During his time in the Marines, he served in Iraq, attaining the rank of Lance Corporal. Once, while stationed in Fallujah, he came across an elderly couple that couldn't evacuate the city due to the wife's illness. As other civilians were being cleared out of the place, LCpl. Driebergen and his squad agreed to watch over them. After a week of protecting the two civilians, the couple was able to make it out of town on their own, unharmed.

Survivor

Heroes v. Healers v. Hustlers
In 2017, Driebergen participated in Survivor: Heroes v. Healers v. Hustlers, the 35th season of Survivor. He was initially placed on the Levu tribe, also known as the Heroes tribe. On Day One, he formed an alliance with Alan Ball, JP Hilsabeck, and Ashley Nolan. When Levu lost the first immunity challenge, Driebergen joined the rest of the Heroes in voting out Trina Radke. Following her elimination, he aligned with Chrissy Hofbeck. Following the tribe switch, he was switched to the Yawa tribe, where he was the only original Levu member, and in the minority. He also took a dislike to new tribemate Cole Medders due to the latter's eating habits.

Driebergen made it to the merge on Day 17. Going into the first post-merge Tribal Council, he and his ally Lauren Rimmer were the swing votes. Both he and Rimmer sided with the Yawa and Levu members at Tribal Council resulting in the elimination of Soko member Jessica Johnston. On Day 25, he and Rimmer, Nolan, and Devon Pinto, formed a Final Four alliance. The next day, Driebergen stumbled on a clue to a Hidden Immunity Idol and managed to find the idol. On Day 27, Pinto suggested that Driebergen play double agent by voting against Mike Zahalsky while his new alliance blindsided Hilsabeck, shocking Driebergen's former allies Hofbeck and Ryan Ulrich.

On Day 33, Driebergen suspected his alliance was plotting against him. At Tribal Council, everyone voted against him, but he played his idol negating the six votes cast against him, and his sole vote blindsided Rimmer. This was the first time in Survivor history that someone was able to negate all of the other votes at Tribal Council with a Hidden Immunity Idol. On Day 36, he found a clue to another idol, and found it moments before Tribal Council. He played the idol before the votes were cast which resulted in Nolan's unanimous elimination. The following morning he found a third idol, tying Russell Hantz in Samoa, Tony Vlachos in Cagayan, and Tai Trang in Game Changers for the record of most Hidden Immunity Idols found in a season, with three. At Tribal Council, he played the idol, which negated the three votes against him, while voting against Pinto, resulting in a 1–1 tie between Pinto and Zahalsky. In the revote, Zahalsky was voted out. On Day 38, Driebergen lost the final immunity challenge to Hofbeck. During Tribal Council, Hofbeck revealed that since she won immunity, she had to choose one person to bring to the Final Three with her, while the other two castaways were to go against each other in a fire-making challenge. She chose to save Ulrich, forcing Driebergen and Pinto to compete in the fire challenge. Driebergen easily won the challenge, joining Hofbeck and Ulrich in the Final Three.

Driebergen received mixed reception during the Final Tribal Council. He was applauded for finding multiple idols, and his strong strategic play, but was condemned particularly by Joe Mena for his weak social game. When Zahalsky and Mena encouraged Driebergen to explain why he believed he should win, he opened up to the jury about his post-traumatic stress disorder and how he has learned to live with it, stating that he hoped to show fellow veterans that while life after the military is difficult, there is more to look forward to in the future. Driebergen was ultimately awarded the title of sole Survivor with five of the eight jury votes. He earned everyone's vote except Nolan, Zahalsky, and Pinto; the former two voted for Hofbeck while the latter voted for Ulrich.

Winners at War
Driebergen returned to compete on the show's 40th season, Survivor: Winners at War. Starting on the Sele tribe, Driebergen would attend three of the first five Tribal Councils. Along the way, Driebergen was immediately pegged as a potential leaker of information when he unintentionally brought up a plan by Danni Boatwright to blindside Rob Mariano in Mariano's presence. Following the Tribe Switch, Driebergen was moved to the new Yara tribe along with former Sele tribemates Mariano and Adam Klein, where they joined Sophie Clarke and Sarah Lacina. Having chafed under Mariano's domineering style of gameplay since the start of the game, Driebergen and Klein turned on Mariano at the earliest opportunity, voting him out at the subsequent Tribal Council.

After reaching the merge, Driebergen found himself in a comfortable position, having joined Tony Vlachos's majority alliance. Driebergen had developed strong bonds with Vlachos, Lacina, Clarke and Denise Stapley during this time. However, his already fractious relationship with Klein started to sour even further, and the two of them would come to distrust each other as the game wore on. Furthermore, Driebergen quickly developed a rivalry with Jeremy Collins, who had found himself on the wrong side of the numbers at the merge. Collins's attempts to align with Driebergen fell on deaf ears, as Driebergen's faith in his alliance was strengthening with each passing day. On Day 29, he found a Hidden Immunity Idol in Vlachos's presence, further cementing their bond.

On Day 31, he received his first elimination votes of the season: from Collins and Michele Fitzgerald. However, Collins's luck ran out and he was voted out. On Day 34, seizing an opportunity to take a shot at the majority alliance, Nick Wilson played his disadvantage on Driebergen, forcing him to set up a 30% longer line of blocks, causing Driebergen to come second in the immunity challenge to Fitzgerald, who was the initial target for that round. However, this wound up backfiring as Wilson was voted out instead.

When Natalie Anderson rejoined the game from the Edge of Extinction, Driebergen sensed she and Fitzgerald were going to take another shot at him, so he played his idol at the Final Six, negating two votes cast against him, resulting in a 0–0 tie. Due to this, Driebergen was forced to vote between two allies: Lacina and Stapley, who were the only eligible players left to vote out. Driebergen wound up siding with Lacina and voted out Stapley. On Day 37, Vlachos won his fourth immunity challenge and Anderson found a hidden immunity idol. Knowing that the jury viewed his game unfavorably and not willing to risk being raked over the coals in Final Tribal Council, Driebergen advised Lacina that if she wanted to differentiate her game from Vlachos, she would have to make a big move on her own. Having seen the writing on the wall for his own game, Driebergen gave Lacina his blessing to vote him out, stating that the friendship he'd built with her was more important to him than his dwindling shot at winning the game. That night, Driebergen and Vlachos voted for Fitzgerald, but Lacina, Fitzgerald and Anderson voted for Driebergen. Driebergen became the eighteenth person voted out from the game and joined the jury having come to terms with his fate and accepting it.

At the Final Tribal Council, Driebergen specifically credited Fitzgerald's win in Survivor: Kaôh Rōng and praised her gameplay, stating that as a "fellow controversial winner", she should be proud of her achievement. Nevertheless, Driebergen voted for Vlachos to win, which he did in a 12-4-0 vote, making him the second two-time winner in Survivor.

The Challenge
Driebergen appears on the series The Challenge: USA on CBS. He made it to the finals of the season to be medically evacuated from the game because of an injury.

Personal life
After completing his service to the Marines, Driebergen worked several regular or odd jobs around the United States. He reconnected with his father and was working at a bar where he met his current wife, Kelly Russell. He proposed to Russell after the birth of his son, Wyatt.
At the time of his Survivor casting, he was employed at a grocery warehouse. He currently works as a real estate agent in Boise, where he lives with his wife Kelly, and their two children, Wyatt and Gracie.

Filmography

Television

References

External links
Official CBS biography page

Living people
People from Boise, Idaho
Survivor (American TV series) winners
Winners in the Survivor franchise
United States Marines
1983 births
United States Marine Corps personnel of the Iraq War
The Challenge (TV series) contestants